One Vanderbilt is a 93-story supertall skyscraper at the corner of 42nd Street and Vanderbilt Avenue in the Midtown Manhattan neighborhood of New York City. Designed by Kohn Pedersen Fox for developer SL Green Realty, the skyscraper opened in 2020.

One Vanderbilt's facade and design is intended to harmonize with Grand Central Terminal immediately to the east. The building's base contains a wedge-shaped void, and the tower tapers as it rises, with several "pavilions" and a pinnacle at the top. The facade is made mostly of glass panels, while the spandrels between stories are made of terracotta. The superstructure is made of steel and concrete, and the interior spaces are designed to be as high as 105 feet (32 m). The lobby has a bank branch and an entrance to the nearby railroad terminal and the associated subway station, while the second floor contains the Le Pavillon restaurant. Most of the building is devoted to office space. The top stories contain the Summit One Vanderbilt observation deck.

SL Green acquired the structures on the site between 2001 and 2011, and announced plans to construct a skyscraper there in 2012. A planned zoning amendment for the neighborhood failed in 2013, delaying the project for several months. TD Bank signed as the anchor tenant in May 2014 and after the skyscraper was approved one year later, the existing structures on the site were demolished. A groundbreaking ceremony for One Vanderbilt was held in October 2016. The tower topped out on September 17, 2019, two months ahead of schedule, but the COVID-19 pandemic delayed its completion. The building opened in September 2020, followed by the observation deck 13 months later.

Site 
One Vanderbilt is in the Midtown Manhattan neighborhood of New York City, just west of Grand Central Terminal. The building takes up the city block bounded by Madison Avenue to the west, the former alignment of Vanderbilt Avenue to the east, 42nd Street to the south, and 43rd Street to the north. Nearby structures include the Lefcourt Colonial Building and One Grand Central Place to the south; Grand Central Terminal to the east; the MetLife Building to the northeast; and 335 Madison Avenue to the north. In addition, the Grand Hyatt New York hotel and the Chrysler Building are one block east, while the Pershing Square Building, the Bowery Savings Bank Building, and the Chanin Building are to the southeast.

The skyscraper replaced several structures built as part of the Terminal City development around Grand Central in the 20th century. The 18-story Vanderbilt Avenue Building, a Warren and Wetmore-designed structure at 51 East 42nd Street, opened as a six-story office complex in 1902 and expanded in the 1920s. It had a two-story Modell's store that sold sport-related items. Some of 51 East 42nd Street's ornate facade details, including terracotta porpoises and cherubs, were saved by the developer and stored until the New York Landmarks Conservancy found a place for them. The 23-story building at 317 Madison Avenue, on the corner with 42nd Street, was designed by Carrère and Hastings and opened in 1922 as the Liggett Building. The Prudence Bond & Mortgage Building at Madison and 43rd, where Governor Al Smith once had gubernatorial campaign headquarters, dates to 1923. Two small structures along 43rd Street respectively housed "an Irish pub and a T.G.I. Friday's."

Pedestrian plaza 
As part of the construction of One Vanderbilt, the section of Vanderbilt Avenue between 42nd and 43rd Streets was decommissioned in September 2016 and redesigned as a pedestrian zone. The Vanderbilt Avenue plaza contains five raised planters as well as LED lighting accents. Unlike other plazas in New York City, it lacks dedicated seating because the plaza was intended to facilitate pedestrian traffic rather than act as a meeting area.

Architecture 
One Vanderbilt was designed by Kohn Pedersen Fox. Severud Associates was the structural engineer, Langan Engineering was the civil engineering consultant, and Jaros, Baum & Bolles was the mechanical and electrical engineer. Structural consultant Thornton Tomasetti worked with Severud to create models for the building's superstructure. Hines Interests Limited Partnership was the project manager, and Tishman Construction was the general contractor. The skyscraper's top floor is numbered 73. According to The Skyscraper Center and building permits, One Vanderbilt has 58 usable stories above ground, while according to Emporis and Hines, the building has 59 stories. Early plans called for a 67-story skyscraper.

SL Green had transferred some air rights from the Bowery Savings Building, and it received additional air rights from the New York City government by improving public transit and adding public space to the area. One Vanderbilt is the city's fourth-tallest building after One World Trade Center, 111 West 57th Street, and Central Park Tower. At completion, it was the second-tallest office building in the city after One World Trade Center, rising above the Chrysler Building. , the building is the 27th-tallest in the world. The building cost $3.31 billion in total.

Form and facade 
One Vanderbilt is set  back from the street to allow better views of Grand Central. On the bottom few floors, the top section of the facade slopes upward, while the bottom section slopes downward, creating a diagonal wedge. Above the wedged base, the building tapers at higher levels. The building's shape allows more sunlight to reach street level compared to alternative designs. Several alternatives were considered before the shape was finalized.

The facade consists mostly of a glass curtain wall with panels that extend from the floor to ceiling of each story. The curtain wall was fabricated by the Permasteelisa Group. According to Permasteelisa, the facade is made of 8,743 pieces in 1,060 distinct shapes, covering . Of these, about 660 panels are placed at the corners; they had to be manufactured in different shapes because the building slopes upward.

Boston Valley Terra Cotta manufactured the terracotta cladding. According to Permasteelisa, there are 34,845 terracotta tiles used in One Vanderbilt's facade. Studio Christine Jetten designed glazing for the terracotta tiles. The panels contain gradual concave curves and are pearl-colored. The tiles reference the color and material used in Grand Central Terminal. and alluded to the color of other office buildings on Madison Avenue. There are mechanical stories on the fourth, fifth, and twelfth floors. At these mechanical stories, there are vertical openings for intake and exhaust, which appear as though they are part of the glass curtain wall.

The top of One Vanderbilt consists of a group of pavilions at different heights, which taper to the antenna. Between the main roof on the 60th floor and a point just above the 66th floor, there are "C"-shaped screens on the east and west sides, collectively known as "the crown". Diagonally sloped steel beams are visible on the exterior of the crown. The western section of the crown has aluminum accent strips on both the diagonal and horizontal beams. The eastern section of the crown has aluminum strips covering the diagonal beams and terracotta tiles covering the horizontal beams.

Structural features 
The foundation contains  of rebar and is anchored to the underlying bedrock using 83 tiebacks. About  of rock had to be excavated for the foundation. Because the base of One Vanderbilt is directly above the train tracks serving Grand Central, several large box columns had to be custom-designed for the building. One such column at the southeast corner does not contain bracing between the ground and sixth stories, allowing the southeast corner to be cantilevered.

The superstructure consists of a steel-and-concrete mechanical core surrounded by a steel frame. The steel was installed in the core first, with the concrete poured around it, which allowed the skyscraper to be constructed similarly to buildings without any concrete core. By the time Severud had published its "100% construction documents" that finalized the construction details, several stories of the steel frame had been erected. The method of construction allowed the steel inside the core to be erected six to twelve floors ahead of the concrete. The rebar is made of 90 percent recycled material.

On the three mechanical levels, the concrete shear walls around the core are reinforced by steel outrigger trusses.

Interior

Commercial and office space 
Underneath the building is a basement loading dock with a turntable, which is accessed by two truck elevators. The base includes a lobby covering . The interior of the lobby contains a bronze "art wall" and a starburst-shaped bronze installation suspended on metal cables.

There are also  of tenant amenities in the building's base, including tenant valet parking at ground level. On the second floor is Daniel Boulud's restaurant Le Pavillon, accessed by its own entrance from ground level. On the third floor is an auditorium, a boardroom, and a flexible meeting space known as the Vandy Club. The flexible space has showers for executives as well as pantries. The third-floor amenities were designed by Gensler.

The subsequent 58 floors contain  of office space. Because of the building's tapering shape, the office space on lower stories is larger than on upper stories. The lower office floors, spanning up to  each, were designed for tenants who needed large amounts of open space, such as newsrooms and trading floors. The middle office floors, spanning , were designed for corporate tenants. The upper stories, covering , were designed for smaller firms such as hedge funds. In marketing documents, floors 10 to 15 are labeled as "podium floors", floors 20 to 38 as "executive floors", floors 44 to 55 as "tower floors", floors 60 to 68 as "penthouse floors", and floors 72 and 73 as "sky floors".

The mechanical space on the 12th physical story contains a chiller plant and electrical transformers. One Vanderbilt was planned to be environmentally efficient from its inception. Much of the building's electricity is generated by natural gas–powered turbines on the 39th physical story. The roof contains a cooling tower with five fans, which remove heat from the building's hot-water pipes; cold water is then sent back to the lower stories. To reduce energy consumption, One Vanderbilt uses both waterside and airside economizers, which use the natural temperature of the building's surroundings. The natural-gas turbines were perceived as energy-efficient when One Vanderbilt was proposed in the 2010s, but they quickly became obsolete; the New York City Council banned fossil fuels in all new buildings in 2021, shortly after One Vanderbilt opened.

Summit One Vanderbilt 

Above floor 73, the top of One Vanderbilt contains an observation deck called Summit One Vanderbilt (branded in all-uppercase letters as SUMMIT One Vanderbilt). Summit One Vanderbilt spans  and contains some restaurants. In 2018, Summit One Vanderbilt was projected to cost approximately $35–39 million. , the adult ticket fee is $39, but New York City residents receive a discount.

Summit One Vanderbilt consists of four components, the interiors of which are being designed by Snøhetta. The second part, "Levitation", is composed of enclosed glass balconies that protrude from the facade. The third part, "Ascent", has two all-glass Cimolai Custom Rack-and-pinion outside elevators which bring visitors to the height where the theoretical 100th floor of the skyscraper would be located. The 93rd floor interior features a glass parapet and a bar. The bars are operated by Danny Meyer’s Union Square Events. Summit One Vanderbilt also contains an interactive art exhibit created by Kenzo Digital. According to a press release published in mid-2021, Summit One Vanderbilt also has a green space, advertised as the world's highest urban "alpine meadow".

Grand Central subway improvements

One Vanderbilt's construction included improvements that would provide extra capacity for over 65,000 passengers going into the New York City Subway at Grand Central–42nd Street. The Metropolitan Transportation Authority (MTA) mandated the station improvements in exchange for allowing the tower's construction. The improvements included an underground connection between Grand Central Terminal and One Vanderbilt; new mezzanines and exits for the subway station, including an entrance directly to the 42nd Street Shuttle platforms; three new stairways to each of the Lexington Avenue Line platforms (along the ); and reconfiguration of columns supporting the nearby Grand Hyatt New York hotel. The project also includes a waiting room for the  terminal under Grand Central,  which opened in 2023 and was built for the Long Island Rail Road as part of the MTA's East Side Access project.

A  transit hall was created within One Vanderbilt itself to connect to the subway and railroad stations. In 2015, SL Green Realty gave $220 million toward the building's construction, of which two-thirds would be used for station redesign, marking the largest private investment in the subway system to date. The building's subway entrance opened on December 9, 2020. The improvements, which cost over $200 million, allowed the subway station to accommodate 4,000 to 6,000 more passengers per hour.

History

Planning

Initial plans 
Developer SL Green Realty began looking at sites for a new office tower in Midtown in the early 2000s. The company began buying buildings on the block bounded by Vanderbilt Avenue, 42nd Street, Madison Avenue, and 43rd Street. The first acquisition was in 2001,
with 317 Madison Avenue.
SL Green initially intended to renovate the building and increase the rents. When two adjacent buildings on the same block were placed for sale in 2007, these were also acquired. According to SL Green managing director Robert Schiffer, this prompted the company to decide on razing these three buildings and replacing them with a larger structure at the address One Vanderbilt Avenue. In 2011, SL Green was able to buy 51 East 42nd Street, the final property on the block.
The four buildings themselves had cost $300 million in total, but SL Green still had to acquire over 150 leases in them.

SL Green also owned the Bowery Savings Bank Building at 110 East 42nd Street, and it had transferred some air rights from the Bowery Savings Bank Building to the One Vanderbilt Avenue site in 2010. The site allowed an "as-of-right" floor area ratio (FAR) of up to 15, but with the Bowery Savings Bank's air rights and several development bonuses, SL Green could obtain a FAR of up to 20.7. This was not enough for SL Green, which required a FAR of 30 for the skyscraper to be profitable. SL Green and Hines met with the New York City Department of City Planning (DCP) in late 2012 to determine which features the planned One Vanderbilt Avenue skyscraper could have. The discussions influenced SL Green to include public indoor and outdoor spaces, as well as a distinctive design, as the DCP mandated. SL Green hired Kohn Pedersen Fox as the planned skyscraper's architect that November.
Sketches published early the following month indicated that the skyscraper would be called "One Vanderbilt".

In late 2013, the administration of outgoing Mayor Michael Bloomberg sought to change zoning regulations for 73 blocks adjacent to Grand Central Terminal. The plan would allow unused air rights above Grand Central Terminal to be transferred to developments on these blocks, including the proposed One Vanderbilt.
Under the proposal, developers of structures on these blocks could deposit money into an improvement fund for East Midtown and, in exchange, receive a FAR of up to 24. Some sites would be eligible for a FAR of up to 30.
The zoning provision would permit One Vanderbilt to obtain the desired FAR of 30.
Bloomberg withdrew his plans that November because residents, preservationists, and local politicians complained about the prospective influx of office workers to the area.
After the rezoning proposal failed, SL Green's CEO Marc Holliday said he was unsure if he would proceed with the development of One Vanderbilt.
Despite this, the design features of the planned skyscraper were retained.

Revival of plans 

When Bill de Blasio succeeded Bloomberg as mayor in 2014, he wished to implement Bloomberg's Midtown East rezoning proposal. That May, TD Bank announced its interest in expanding offices within New York City, focusing in particular on the delayed One Vanderbilt development, where it could be an anchor tenant. The following week, SL Green officially revived its plans for One Vanderbilt. Mayor de Blasio's administration proposed rezoning the area around Vanderbilt Avenue to allow One Vanderbilt to be constructed. Unlike Bloomberg's proposal, which would have converted all of Vanderbilt Avenue to a pedestrian plaza, de Blasio's proposal only called for the conversion of a short section outside One Vanderbilt.

Since Grand Central Terminal was a New York City designated landmark, the New York City Landmarks Preservation Commission (LPC) had to endorse development around the terminal. SL Green thus applied to the LPC for a "certificate of appropriateness" regarding the transfer of air rights from the Bowery Savings Bank Building. At a hearing in July 2014, the LPC endorsed One Vanderbilt's construction, though the Historic Districts Council and the Society for the Architecture of the City both expressed strong opposition. In exchange for further increases to the FAR, and thus the building's height, SL Green proposed transit improvements around Grand Central in September 2014. At public hearings for the proposed transit improvements, neighborhood residents questioned the high price of the improvements, which was quoted at $210 million. Conversely, transit experts stated that the cost of the improvements was justified due to the amount of work that was necessary.

Shortly after One Vanderbilt's plans were revived, Andrew Penson—the founder of Midtown TDR Ventures, which owned the land under Grand Central Terminal—threatened to sue for $1 billion in a dispute concerning the air rights above the terminal's underground tracks. SL Green rejected Penson's offer as a "publicity stunt".

The following month, TD Bank signed a lease at the building, officially becoming an anchor tenant. Disputes over the proposed transit improvements at One Vanderbilt continued. That December, an advisory task force composed of two local community boards indicated that it would oppose the improvements unless the building's energy efficiency was increased and one of the Grand Central entrances was relocated. In January 2015, Manhattan Borough President Gale Brewer endorsed the project with several stipulations, including benches and restrooms in the proposed transit hall, as well as a requirement that SL Green maintain the plaza on Vanderbilt Avenue. Public hearings on the proposed rezoning of One Vanderbilt proceeded the next month. Constitutional lawyer Laurence Tribe testified against the proposal on behalf of Penson, under the argument that SL Green had taken Grand Central's air rights from the city rather than purchasing them from Penson. In March 2015, the DCP approved the Vanderbilt Avenue rezoning as well as SL Green's proposal for One Vanderbilt.

Construction 

The Vanderbilt Avenue rezoning received unanimous approval from the New York City Council in May 2015, following an endorsement by the council's zoning subcommittee. Immediately afterward, SL Green announced it would start demolishing structures on the site. During demolition of one of the buildings that July, a chandelier and a banister fell on four construction workers who were taking down the chandelier, injuring them. By the following month, some excavations had begun. With excavation ongoing, in September 2015, SL Green filed construction plans for a  tower, slightly shorter than what had been announced the previous year. The same month, Penson sued the city and SL Green for $1.1 billion, claiming that the city government had given SL Green the air rights over Grand Central for free. Midtown TDR dropped the lawsuit in August 2016 in exchange for an undisclosed sum.

At a forum in June 2016, SL Green had indicated that the building could cost about $3.14 billion. That month, a consortium of banks including Wells Fargo, The Bank of New York Mellon, JPMorgan Chase, Toronto-Dominion Bank, Bank of China, and Landesbank Baden-Württemberg offered a $1.5 billion, five-year loan for the tower's construction. The loan was finalized that September. The following month, general contractor AECOM Tishman subcontracted the construction of One Vanderbilt to Navillus Tile for $135.9 million. Liberty Mutual was the guarantor for the contract. An official groundbreaking occurred on October 18, 2016. At the ceremony, de Blasio described One Vanderbilt as the "right kind" of development in East Midtown, while Brewer said the planned skyscraper had "set the bar very high" for other new developments nearby. No other tenants besides TD Bank had yet signed leases for space in One Vanderbilt. That December, plans for the building's observation deck were announced.

In January 2017, South Korea's National Pension Service and development firm Hines Interests Limited Partnership paid a combined $525 million for a 27.6% and 1.4% stake in the development, respectively. At the time, SL Green projected that One Vanderbilt would earn $198 million annually, including $42 million from the observation deck alone. Foundation laying started the next month. The work included one of the largest continuous concrete pours to ever take place in New York City. By that June, the skyscraper's first vertical beams had been constructed. One Vanderbilt's superstructure reached above ground level in October 2017. The following month, Navillus filed for bankruptcy, and Tishman moved to end its subcontract with Navillus, though work on the skyscraper continued. In January 2018, Tishman, SL Green, and Liberty Mutual agreed to let Navillus complete the subcontract for One Vanderbilt's construction.

One Vanderbilt's construction proceeded faster than originally scheduled and, by February 2018, the tower had been completed to the ninth floor. By June of the same year, the tower had reached the sixteenth floor. Facade installation began in August 2018, at which point the structure had passed the 30th floor, or more than half its eventual height. By November, the structure had reached the 56th floor, high enough to provide views above neighboring buildings. Around that time, SL Green refinanced the construction loan, increasing it to $1.75 billion and reducing the interest rate. The building topped out on September 17, 2019.

Completion 
At the end of 2019, SL Green announced that the building was expected to open the following August. Shortly afterward, the top part of the spire was temporarily removed so construction cranes could add cladding to the crown. The building's completion was delayed slightly in early 2020 due to the COVID-19 pandemic in New York City. By that June, the building was 67 percent leased in spite of the pandemic. Prior to the COVID-19 pandemic, One Vanderbilt's leasing agents had sought for the building to be 82 percent leased by the end of 2020; however, the agents revised their forecast to 72 percent.

The New York City Department of Buildings issued a temporary certificate of occupancy for One Vanderbilt on September 11, 2020. One Vanderbilt was formally opened with a ceremony three days later, on September 14. At the time, tenant spaces were incomplete and the first tenants could not move into the building until that November. The Le Pavillon restaurant at the building's base opened in May 2021. The following month, a banking consortium led by Wells Fargo and Goldman Sachs refinanced One Vanderbilt for about $3 billion. The refinancing included a 10-year, fixed-rate loan using commercial mortgage-backed securities and was intended to pay off part of the $1.75 billion debt incurred during construction. 

Ticket sales for Summit One Vanderbilt launched in September 2021, a month before the planned October 21 opening, and a press preview was held on September 24. The building was 90 percent leased by October 2021; the Financial Times quoted Holliday as saying he wished the building "had 20 more floors because if [he] did we could lease them". Summit One Vanderbilt opened on October 21 of that year. By late 2022, ninety-nine percent of One Vanderbilt's office space had been leased.

Tenants
To attract tenants to One Vanderbilt, SL Green offered to pay off their old leases, such as that of The Carlyle Group, whose lease SL Green paid off for around $100 million. , the building is 90 percent leased. Tenants include:
 Lobby and anchor tenant: FL 14, 20, 21, 22, 23 TD Bank
 2nd floor: Le Pavillon restaurant
 10th–12th floors: TD Securities
 15th floor: Kyndryl
 15th–16th floors: Oak Hill Advisors
 24th floor: Accordion Partners, InTandem Capital Partners, and Sagewind Capital LLC
 26th floor: DZ Bank
 27th–28th floors: SL Green
 29th–31st floors: Greenberg Traurig
 33rd floor: Walker & Dunlop
 34th–38th floors: The Carlyle Group
 44th–47th, 67th floors: McDermott Will & Emery
 48th floor: MFA Financial
 51st floor: Mamoura Holdings
 52nd floor: KPS Capital Partners
 55th floor: Undisclosed financial service firm
 60th floor: UiPath, a software company for robotic process automation
 62nd floor: FIS Global
 73rd floor: GFL Environmental
 Four unidentified floors: Stone Ridge Asset Management

Critical reception 
Writing for The Real Deal magazine in December 2015, James Gardiner said the proposal "does not feel as striking or impressive as one could want", in that it failed to stand out in any way other than its height. Justin Davidson of New York magazine described One Vanderbilt as a rare "civic-minded Goliath" in that, while other skyscrapers are usually built in a design that maximizes profit, One Vanderbilt's base is designed for easier pedestrian and transit access in the nearby area.

See also
 List of tallest buildings in New York City
 List of tallest freestanding structures in the world
 List of tallest freestanding steel structures
 List of tallest buildings

References

Notes

Citations

Sources

External links

 

2020 establishments in New York City
2020s in Manhattan
42nd Street (Manhattan)
Kohn Pedersen Fox buildings
Madison Avenue
Midtown Manhattan
Office buildings completed in 2020
Skyscraper office buildings in Manhattan